Eels: Royal Albert Hall is a live album by Eels, released as a 2-Disc CD, 3-Disc clear purple vinyl and a DVD on April 14, 2015. The recording is from London's Royal Albert Hall, June 30, 2014. It is the third Eels live DVD.

CD track listing
"Where I'm At" – 2:22
"When You Wish Upon a Star" (Leigh Harline, Ned Washington) – 1:55
"The Morning" – 1:49
"Parallels" – 3:07
"Addressing the Royal Audience" – 3:32
"Mansions Of Los Feliz" – 2:55
"My Timing Is Off" – 2:58
"A Line in the Dirt" – 3:34
"Where I'm From" – 3:17
"It's A Motherfucker" – 2:24
"Lockdown Hurricane" – 3:33
"A Daisy Through Concrete" – 3:15
Introducing the band – 3:25
"Grace Kelly Blues" – 3:09
"Fresh Feeling" – 3:29
"I Like Birds" – 2:33
"My Beloved Monster" – 3:10
"Gentlemen's Choice" – 2:49
"Mistakes Of My Youth"/"Wonderful, Glorious" – 6:01
"Where I'm Going" – 4:08

First Encore
"I Like The Way This Is Going" – 2:50
"Blinking Lights (For Me)" – 2:11
"Last Stop: This Town" – 4:01

Second Encore
"The Beginning" – 2:39
"Can't Help Falling in Love" (Hugo Peretti, Luigi Creatore, George David Weiss) – 2:34
"Turn On Your Radio" (Harry Nilsson) – 3:24

"Phantom" Encore (Played using Royal Albert Hall's pipe organ)
"Flyswatter" – 1:10
"The Sound of Fear" – 1:20

DVD track listing
"Where I'm At"
"When You Wish Upon a Star" (Leigh Harline, Ned Washington)
"The Morning"
"Parallels"
"Addressing the Royal Audience"
"Mansions of Los Feliz"
"My Timing Is Off"
"A Line in the Dirt"
"Where I'm From"
"It's a Motherfucker"
"Lockdown Hurricane"
"A Daisy Through Concrete"
"Introducing the Band"
"Grace Kelly Blues"
"Fresh Feeling"
"I Like Birds"
"My Beloved Monster"
"Gentlemen's Choice"
"Mistakes of My Youth"/"Wonderful, Glorious"
"Where I'm Going"

First Encore
"I Like The Way This Is Going"
"Blinking Lights (For Me)"
"Last Stop: This Town"

Second Encore
"The Beginning"
"Can't Help Falling in Love" (Hugo Peretti, Luigi Creatore, George David Weiss)
"Turn On Your Radio" (Harry Nilsson)

"Phantom" Encore (Played using Royal Albert Hall's pipe organ)
"Flyswatter"
"The Sound of Fear"

Personnel
Eels
E – vocals, guitar, and keyboards
The Chet – pedal steel guitar, guitar, melodica
P-Boo – guitar, trumpet, piano
Royal Al – upright bass, bowed bass
Knuckles – percussion

Production
Recording Engineer: Kevin Vanbergen

Compact Disc
Unknown

DVD
Charlie Lightening;– Direction
 Alejandro Reyes-Knight Creative Production

Charts

Weekly

Year-end

References

External links
Official web site

Eels (band) video albums
Eels (band) live albums
Live video albums
2015 live albums
2015 video albums
Vagrant Records live albums
Vagrant Records video albums
Albums produced by Mark Oliver Everett
Albums recorded at the Town Hall